Actinoptera brahma is a species of tephritid or fruit flies in the genus Actinoptera of the family Tephritidae.

Distribution
India, Sri Lanka.

References

Tephritinae
Insects described in 1868
Diptera of Asia